Burringham is a village and civil parish in North Lincolnshire, England. The population of the civil parish at the 2011 census was 737.

Burringham's Grade II listed Anglican church is dedicated to St John the Baptist. It was designed by Samuel Sanders Teulon in 1856–67.

The village primary school is halfway between Gunness and Burringham. The public house, Take a Gander, is on the High Street. Burringham used to share the Gunness and Burringham railway station.

References

External links

Villages in the Borough of North Lincolnshire
Civil parishes in Lincolnshire